Isaac Lee Possin (born 1971) is a Colombian journalist, entrepreneur and film & television producer.  He is the executive chairman and founder of EXILE Content, a media company developing premium original content for audiences across the U.S. and Latin America.  He previously served as Chief Content Officer for Univision Communications and Televisa, the world's largest Spanish-language media conglomerate, and founder of StoryHouse Entertainment, the Los Angeles-based scripted content development unit of Univision, producer of acclaimed scripted TV Series "El Chapo" (Netflix), as well as "Outpost" (HBO), "Residente" and "Hate Rising" docu-features.

Lee was born in Bogotá, Colombia to Jewish immigrants.

Career
When Lee was 23, he reported that Colombia's then president Ernesto Samper had received funding from the Cali Cartel. Lee was fired immediately afterward.

At the age of 25, Lee was appointed editor of Cromos. At 26, he was named editor-in-chief of the Colombian magazine Semana. During his tenure at Semana, the magazine became a publishing house with several titles and digital properties.  The magazine was crucial in several of Colombia's most important political junctures.  A 1997 cover story forced two Colombian cabinet ministers to resign shortly after. Semana also covered political corruption, guerrillas, the military and paramilitaries, narco-traffickers and the peace process.

PODER Magazine 
Lee founded and was the editor-in-chief of PODER Magazine, a pan-regional magazine for the business elite with special editions for the US Hispanic market, Mexico, Colombia, Chile, Venezuela and Peru with a total circulation of over half a million copies. The magazine was later sold to Televisa and other investors.

Univision
On December 9, 2010 Univision announced the appointment of Lee as President of News.

Shortly after joining Univision, Lee announced he was working on the launch of a 24-hour cable news channel in English; the new channel was officially announced in May 2012 as a joint venture between The Walt Disney Company and Univision.  In February 2013, both networks announced the new channel would be called Fusion.

Two new departments within news were created in 2011: an Investigative Unit led by Gerardo Reyes and a Documentary Unit led by Juan Rendón.  The Documentary Unit later became StoryHouse a content development and production venture producing original content for UCI's portfolio of owned networks as well as third party networks and platforms.

Under Lee's tenure, Univision News has attained several recognitions for journalistic excellence such as the 2012 Peabody and IRE Awards for its "Fast and Furious" investigation, three Emmy's for outstanding investigative reporting, outstanding newsmagazine and outstanding breaking news coverage and two Gracie awards, and the Cronkite Award for Excellence in Political Journalism.

In February 2015, as part of a reorganization of Univision's digital operation, Lee's role was expanded to lead Digital for all of Univision as President of Digital.  Shortly after, under Lee's leadership, Univision announced the acquisition of African-American news site The Root.

In November 2015 Lee was named to the newly created position of chief news and digital officer, with additional responsibilities over multicultural and music and maintaining oversight of the news and digital divisions.

Organizations and Boards

 Board of Directors Associated Press
 Board of advisors of the University of Chicago Institute of Politics
 Journalism advisory board of ProPublica.
 International Advisory Board of the Committee to protect journalists.
 Hirshhorn Museum
Frmr. Boardmember Legendary Pictures
Board of Directors Ualá

Lee is also a member of the IAPA, the NAHJ, the Foro Iberoamérica Presided by Ricardo Lagos and Carlos Fuentes and the Council on foreign Relations.

Projects

Film 

 Paraiso Travel (2008)  He was a producer of feature film "Paraíso Travel", an immigration story based on a novel of acclaimed writer Jorge Franco.
 When lambs become lions (2019)  Lee was the executive producer for this feature film where a small-time ivory dealer fights to stay on top while forces mobilize to destroy his trade. When he turns to his younger cousin, a conflicted wildlife ranger who hasn't been paid in months, they both see a possible lifeline.

TV 

 El Chapo (2017)  Produced TV Series for Univision and Netflix about El Chapo's life in crime, from his lowly beginnings in the Guadalajara Cartel in the 1980s through his rise to power—and eventual fall—as the leader of the Sinaloa Cartel.
 Colombia Hostage Rescue (2010)  In 2010 he co-produced his first documentary "Colombia Hostage Rescue" for National Geographic TV which aired in 13 countries.
 Operación Jaque  He also co-produced with Televisión Española an International Emmy Award nominated TV mini-series about Operación Jaque.
 Who Killed Malcolm X 6 part investigative follows activist and investigative journalist Abdur-Rahman Muhammad as he embarks on a complex mission seeking truth about the assassination of the African American Leader Malcolm X.
 TrumpLand Fusion teams up with “Kill All Normies” author Angela Nagle to examine the social and political forces which have emboldened white nationalists in the age of Trump, in this follow-up to the emmy-nominated: The Naked Truth-Trumpland.

Other Projects 

 Mars 2030 VR  A virtual reality exploration of Mars with a realistic future habitat on the surface of the red planet.  The simulation includes a dig into the history of the planet's landmarks in immersive 3D.  Developed in collaboration with NASA and MIT.

Personal life
Lee is openly gay.

References

External links
 EXILE CONTENT Homepage
 Isaac Lee on IMDB.com

1971 births
Living people
Colombian businesspeople
Colombian journalists
Male journalists
Colombian Jews
Colombian emigrants to the United States
Colombian magazine editors
Television executives
Colombian chief executives
Univision people
Gay journalists
Colombian LGBT journalists
Colombian gay writers
Gay Jews
American people of Colombian-Jewish descent